Lee Joo-won (Hangul: 이주원; Hanja: 李珠沅;born August 18, 1999) better known by her stage name JooE (주이), is a South Korean rapper and singer. She is a former member of the girl group Momoland under MLD Entertainment.

Personal life 
JooE was born in Seoul, South Korea, She has an older brother named Lee Min Jae. On an episode of Radio Star, JooE revealed that she had undergone rhinoplasty in prior to joining MLD Entertainment. JooE cited singer IU as her role model, saying "IU sunbaenim. Of course she's gorgeous and an amazing singer, but I also find it respectful that she has a very pronounced perspective, and you can feel that in her music."

Education 
JooE studied and graduated from Damoon Elementary School and Yongmun Middle School, she also graduated from Hanlim Multi Art School on February 9, 2018.

Career 
In 2016, JooE became a contestant in Finding Momoland, a show dedicated to select the members of the new girl group Momoland under MLD Entertainment. JooE joined MLD a month before Finding Momoland began. In June 2016, members JooE, alongside Nancy, Ahin, Hyebin, Yeonwoo, Jane and Nayun were selected as the seven finalists of Finding Momoland. After the members were selected, the group was formed and made their official debut with the mini album Welcome to Momoland, released on November 10, 2016.

In 2018, JooE appeared in King of Mask Singer as Helicopter. In 2022, JooE became a contestant on JTBC's singing survival show The Second World, where she obtained fourth place.

On January 27, 2023, it was announced that JooE, along with the Momoland members, departed from MLD Entertainment following expiration of the contracts. Momoland officially announced their disbandment on February 14.

Other ventures

Endorsements 
JooE became a ambassador of the makeup brand Baker 7 in 2018. She has also filmed an advertisement for Tropicana's sparkling soda and for GS25, both in 2017. She has also advertised for Guronsan Barmond in 2018 and for Mom's Touch in 2019 alongside YouTuber Yunjuku.

Filmography

Television series

Television shows

Discography

References

External links 

 

Momoland members
Living people
21st-century South Korean women singers
South Korean female idols
South Korean women rappers
South Korean female dancers
1999 births
Hanlim Multi Art School alumni
Rappers from Seoul
Singers from Seoul